Pádraig Crowley (born 1957) is an Irish retired hurler who played for club side Bandon, divisional side Carbery and was a member of the Cork senior hurling team from 1980 until 1984.

Career

Born in Bandon, Crowley first came to prominence on the inter-county scene on the Cork minor team that lost to Kilkenny in the 1975 All-Ireland final. Munster Championship success followed with the under-21 team before a spell with the Cork senior team yielded a National League medal and back-to-back Munster Championship titles. Crowley enjoyed a 23-season club career with Bandon, however, it was with divisional side Carbery that he enjoyed his greatest club success when the division claimed the 1994 County Championship.

Honours

Bandon
 South West Junior A Hurling Championship: 1990, 1995

Carbery
 Cork Senior Hurling Championship: 1994

Cork
 Munster Senior Hurling Championship: 1982, 1983
 National Hurling League: 1980-81
 Munster Under-21 Hurling Championship: 1977
 Munster Minor Hurling Championship: 1975

References

1957 births
Living people
Bandon hurlers
Bandon Gaelic footballers
Carbery hurlers
Cork inter-county hurlers
Hurling selectors